Bernadett Határ (born August 24, 1994) is a Hungarian basketball player for Uniqa Sopron and the Hungarian national team.

She participated at the EuroBasket Women 2015 and EuroBasket Women 2017.

WNBA career statistics

Regular season

|-
| align="left" | 2021
| align="left" | Indiana
| 7 || 2 || 15.1 || .483 || .000 || .857 || 2.6 || 0.3 || 0.4 || 1.6 || 4.9
|-
| align="left" | Career
| align="left" | 1 year, 1 team
| 7 || 2 || 15.1 || .483 || .000 || .857 || 2.6 || 0.3 || 0.4 || 1.6 || 4.9

References

External links
Bernadett Határ at WNBA

1994 births
Living people
Centers (basketball)
Hungarian expatriate basketball people in the United States
Hungarian women's basketball players
Indiana Fever players
People from Pásztó
Sportspeople from Nógrád County